Lääneranna Parish is a rural municipality in Pärnu County. It includes the town of Lihula.

Settlements
Town
Lihula

Boroughs
Virtsu

Villages
There are 150 villages: Alaküla, Allika, Aruküla, Emmu, Esivere, Haapsi, Hanila, Helmküla, Hälvati, Hõbeda, Hõbesalu, Irta, Iska, Joonuse, Jänistvere, Järise, Järve, Jõeääre, Kadaka, Kalli, Kanamardi, Karinõmme, Karuba, Karuse, Kaseküla, Kause, Keemu, Kelu, Kibura, Kidise, Kiisamaa, Kilgi, Kinksi, Kirbla, Kirikuküla, Kiska, Kloostri, Koeri, Kokuta, Koonga, Korju, Kuhu, Kuke, Kulli, Kunila, Kurese, Käru, Kõera, Kõima, Audru Parish, Kõima, Lääneranna Parish, Kõmsi, Laulepa, Lautna, Linnuse, Liustemäe, Lõo, Lõpe, Maade, Maikse, Massu, Matsalu, Matsi, Meelva, Mereäärse, Metsküla, Mihkli, Muriste, Mäense, Mäliküla, Mõisaküla, Mõisimaa, Mõtsu, Naissoo, Nedrema, Nehatu, Nurme, Nurmsi, Nätsi, Nõmme, Oidrema, Paadrema, Paatsalu, Pagasi, Paimvere, Pajumaa, Palatu, Parasmaa, Parivere, Peanse, Peantse, Penijõe, Petaaluse, Piha, Piisu, Pikavere, Pivarootsi, Poanse, Rabavere, Raespa, Raheste, Rame, Rannaküla, Rannu, Rauksi, Ridase, Rooglaiu, Rootsi, Rootsi-Aruküla, Rumba, Rädi, Saare, Saastna, Salavere, Salevere, Saulepi, Seira, Seli, Selja, Sookalda, Sookatse, Soovälja, Tamba, Tamme, Tarva, Tiilima, Tuhu, Tuudi, Täpsi, Tõitse, Tõusi, Ullaste, Uluste, Ura, Urita, Vagivere, Vaiste, Valuste, Vanamõisa, Varbla, Vastaba, Vatla, Veltsa, Voose, Võhma, Võigaste, Võitra, Võrungi, Äila, Ännikse, Õepa, Õhu.

Religion

References